Abdullah Ahmad Badawi formed the second Abdullah cabinet after being invited by Tuanku Syed Sirajuddin to begin a new government following the 21 March 2004 general election in Malaysia. Prior to the election, Abdullah led (as Prime Minister) the first Abdullah cabinet, a coalition government that consisted of members of the component parties of Barisan Nasional. It was the 16th cabinet of Malaysia formed since independence.

This is a list of the members of the second cabinet of the fifth Prime Minister of Malaysia, Abdullah Ahmad Badawi.

Composition

Full members
The federal cabinet consisted of the following ministers:

Deputy ministers

See also
 Members of the Dewan Rakyat, 11th Malaysian Parliament
 List of parliamentary secretaries of Malaysia#Second Abdullah cabinet

Cabinet of Malaysia
2004 establishments in Malaysia
2008 disestablishments in Malaysia
Cabinets established in 2004
Cabinets disestablished in 2008